Madhya Pradesh State Highway 22 (MP SH 22) is a State Highway running from Khategaon till Amarkantak. It is popularly known as Jabalpur Road.

It passes through Hoshangabad,  Jabalpur the cultural capital of Madhya Pradesh till the Madhya Pradesh-Chhattisgarh Border via Nasrullaganj, Sohagpur, Pipariya, Gadarwara, Narsinghpur and Dindori.

See also
List of state highways in Madhya Pradesh

References

State Highways in Madhya Pradesh